Mariusz Luncik (born 1 May 1971) is a retired Polish football goalkeeper.

References

1971 births
Living people
Polish footballers
GKS Katowice players
GKS Tychy players
GKS Bełchatów players
Wuppertaler SV players
Lech Poznań players
Kujawiak Włocławek players
Association football goalkeepers
Polish expatriate footballers
Expatriate footballers in Germany
Polish expatriate sportspeople in Germany